Mangali, near Badya Jattan, is a village of more than 10,000 population with 5 gram panchayat (Mangali Aklan,  Mangali Surtiya, Mangali Mohabbat, Mangali Dhani and Mangali Jhara) in it, the only village in Haryana having 5 panchayat in single village, of Hisar-1 Rural Development Block, Nalwa Chaudhry (Vidhan Sabha constituency) and Hisar (Lok Sabha constituency) of Hisar District of Hisar Division in the Haryana state of India.

History

During British Raj

Rao Shekha, a Shekhawat rajput  (sub-branch of Kachwaha or Kushwaha), was the founder of Shekhawati, who originally divided Shekhawati into 33 Thikana (also called a Pargana). After him, additional thikanas were granted to the descendants of subsequent generations.
 Tosham Thikana was granted as a thikana by Shekhawati ruler Maharaja Mukund Singh in 1870 to Kunwar Abhaya Singh, the son of Maharaja Raj Singh II. During the Indian Rebellion of 1857, Hindu Shekhawat rajput officials of British Raj based at Tosham killed the Bhati and Ranghar Muslim Rajputs of Jamalpur and Mangali. These Hindu thakurs (Shekhawat) were granted the Thikana of Tosham as a Pargana under Shekhawati in 1870 by the British raj and Maharaja Mukund Singh for their services.

Post-independence
After Independence of India in 1947, it became part of Punjab. Once Haryana was formed as a separate state in 1966, it became part of the Hisar district, state of Haryana State.

Transportation
Mangali is connected by road with Hisar,  distant.

Currently no commercial domestic or international flights from this airport.

Revenue, Agriculture, Health and Other Services
There is a Patwari (Government Land Records Officer), an Agriculture Development Officer (ADO), a Rural Health Officer (RHO), and an Anganwadi (Community Childcare) worker based at village.

See also

 Bidhwan
 Badya Jattan
 Badyan Brahmnan
 Kanwari
 Nalwa
 Tosham

References

External links
 Google location map

Villages in Hisar district